George Leslie Grainge (29 November 1910 – 29 August 1983) was an English professional rugby league footballer who played in the 1930s.

Background
Les Grainge was born in Keighley, West Riding of Yorkshire, England, he attended Woodhouse Grove School, in Apperley Bridge, where he was Head Prefect and Victor Ludorum twice, and captain of the cricket, rugby union and lacrosse teams, he died aged 72 in Keswick, Cumbria, England.

International honours
Les Grainge won a cap for England while at Bradford Northern in the 17-15 victory over France at Stade Buffalo, Paris on Sunday 20 March 1938.

Note
Although Les Grainge's date of birth is stated as 29 November 1910, his birth was not registered until first ¼ 1911 in Keighley district.

References

1910 births
1983 deaths
Bradford Bulls players
England national rugby league team players
English rugby league players
Rugby league players from Keighley
Rugby league wingers